Birahim Sarr (born 27 July 1991) is a French footballer of Senegalese descent who plays as a defender for the Swedish club Västerås SK.

Career

Montana
On 15 January 2017, Sarr signed a 1-year contract with Bulgarian First League side Montana, after impressing in a single training session and one friendly game against Kariana Erden.  On 1 March 2017, he made his debut in a 1–0 away win against relegation rivals Lokomotiv Gorna Oryahovitsa, keeping a rare clean sheet in the team's first away victory of the season. He was released in June 2017 due to a relegation clause in his contract.
On 24 August 2017, Sarr returned to his former team Montana in order to play in the Bulgarian Second League.

References

External links
 
 

Living people
1991 births
French footballers
French sportspeople of Senegalese descent
French expatriate footballers
French expatriate sportspeople in Cyprus
Expatriate footballers in Cyprus
French expatriate sportspeople in Romania
Expatriate footballers in Romania
French expatriate sportspeople in Bulgaria
Expatriate footballers in Bulgaria
Liga II players
Cypriot Second Division players
First Professional Football League (Bulgaria) players
Second Professional Football League (Bulgaria) players
Nikos & Sokratis Erimis FC players
CS Șoimii Pâncota players
FC Montana players
Västerås SK Fotboll players
Sportspeople from Troyes
Association football central defenders
Footballers from Grand Est
French expatriate sportspeople in Sweden
Expatriate footballers in Sweden